Ten Years of Gold is the fourth studio album by Kenny Rogers issued in 1978. It spent two years on the album chart and peaked at #33. In 1997, the album was certified 4× Platinum by the RIAA.

Overview
As his fourth solo album, Ten Years of Gold is a collection of ten songs spanning the last decade. The album features solo re-recordings of hits Kenny had with The First Edition. These new versions were recorded at Jack Clement Recording Studio "B" using Kenny Rogers' road band "Bloodline" (listed below). Side 1 of the LP contained the all re-recordings.  Though Kenny had already scored three other solo hits, "Lucille", "Daytime Friends", "While The Feeling's Good" and "Love Lifted Me" are all that represent his recent work. The last track is the First Edition's original hit recording of "Today I Started Loving You Again", which was featured on the First Edition's 1972 album Back Roads; Kenny still had the rights on this song, therefore this version is present. Oddly the First Edition are not credited on the album jacket, even individually.

There were two different versions of the cover art. One had Kenny's name in white next to the title and a mock pasted photo on the back. On the second pressing the photo is retouched to look like it is in a gold frame.

Track listing

 
 Note: Rogers composed the two new verses to "Love Lifted Me" although he is not credited for this.

Personnel
 Kenny Rogers – guitar, lead vocals
 Randy Dorman, Rick Harper – guitar
 Gene Golden – Fender Rhodes keyboard bass
 Gene Golden, Steve Glassmeyer, Edgar Struble – keyboards
 Bobby Daniels – drums
 Gene Golden, Steve Glassmeyer, Bobby Daniels – backing vocals
Technical
 Billy Sherrill – engineer
 Garth Shaw – road manager

Chart performance

References

1978 greatest hits albums
Kenny Rogers compilation albums
Albums produced by Larry Butler (producer)
United Artists Records compilation albums